Masghati (in Persian:مسقطی) is a soft and transparent confection in Iran made with rose water, starch, sugar and water. Along with koloocheh, it is a tradition of Norooz New Year celebrations. Pistachio, saffron, and cardamom can also be used to make masghati.
Masghati is produced in Fars province, particularly in Kazeroun, Larestan county and Shiraz. The masghati which is produced in Kazeroun and Larestan are more viscous and sweeter than the Shirazi one.
Koloocheh and Masghati are souvenirs of Shiraz.

References

Confectionery
Iranian cuisine

See also
 Turkish delight